The Coupe de France's results of the 1968–69 season. Olympique de Marseille won the final played on May 18, 1969, beating Girondins de Bordeaux.

Round of 16

Quarter-finals

Semi-finals
First round

Second round

Final

References

French federation

1968–69 domestic association football cups
1968–69 in French football
1968-69